Marian Cleeves Diamond (November 11, 1926 – July 25, 2017) was an American scientist and educator who is considered one of the founders of modern neuroscience.  She and her team were the first to publish evidence that the brain can change with experience and improve with enrichment, what is now called neuroplasticity. Her research on the brain of Albert Einstein helped fuel the ongoing scientific revolution in understanding the roles of glial cells in the brain. Her YouTube Integrative Biology lectures were the second most popular college course in the world in 2010. She was a professor of anatomy at the University of California, Berkeley.  Other published research explored differences between the cerebral cortex of male and female rats, the link between positive thinking and immune health, and the role of women in science.

Biography

Early life
Marian Cleeves was born in Glendale, California to Dr. Montague Cleeves and Rosa Marian Wamphler Cleeves as the sixth and last child in the family. Her father was an English physician and her mother a Latin teacher at Berkeley High School.  Diamond grew up in La Crescenta.  She was educated with her siblings near home at La Crescenta grammar school, Clark Junior High, Glendale High School and finally Glendale Community College, before going to University of California, Berkeley.  She played tennis at Berkeley, earning a letter.

Career
After graduating with a bachelor's degree in 1948, Diamond spent a summer at the University of Oslo, Norway before returning to Berkeley for her graduate studies, the first female graduate student in the department of anatomy.  Her doctoral dissertation thesis "Functional Interrelationships of the Hypothalamus and the Neurohypophysis" was published in 1953.

While studying for her PhD degree, Diamond also began to teach, a passion that continued well into her eighties. Marian Diamond received her PhD degree in human anatomy. After working as a research assistant at Harvard University between 1952–53, Diamond became the first woman science instructor at Cornell University from 1955–58 where she taught human biology and comparative anatomy. Diamond returned to the University of California, Berkeley in 1960 in the role of lecturer. In the role as neuroanatomist, Diamond joined an ongoing research project with psychologists David Krech, Mark Rosenzweig, and chemist Edward Bennett, as a neuroanatomist.

By 1964, Diamond had the first evidence, from anatomical measurements, of plasticity in the mammalian cerebral cortex. These results "opened the doors for our experiments to follow for the next 37 years."

UC Berkeley invited Diamond to be an Assistant Professor in 1965, progressing later to be a full professor, and finally, Professor Emeritus until her death in 2017. In 1984, Diamond and her associates had access to sufficient tissue from Einstein's brain to make the first ever analysis of it, followed by publication of their research. The 1985 paper "On the Brain of a Scientist: Albert Einstein" created some controversy in academia over the role of glial cells. However, it also ushered in new interest in neuroglia.

Personal life
Diamond married Richard Martin Diamond in 1950 and they had four children: Catherine Theresa (1953), Richard Cleeves (1955), Jeff Barja (1958), and Ann (1962). They divorced in 1979 after which Diamond married Professor Arnold Bernard Scheibel in 1982.

Documentary film

My Love Affair with the Brain: The Life and Science of Dr. Marian Diamond is a 2017 documentary about Diamond's life as a pioneering woman of science, her curiosity and passion for the human brain, as well as her research and love of teaching.   Producer-directors Catherine Ryan and Gary Weimberg of Luna Productions followed Dr. Diamond with their camera(s) for the final 5 years of her science and teaching career.  The film's opening scene is Dr. Diamond with her signature teaching move: opening a floral hat box to reveal a preserved human brain, which she then holds in her hand while enumerating one of her many favorite aphorisms of appreciations of the brain, such as:  "The brain is a three pound mass you can hold in your hand that can conceive of a universe a hundred billion light-years across."

My Love Affair with the Brain was broadcast on PBS, was nominated for an Emmy Award for Outstanding Science and Technology Documentary (2018, National News and Documentary Emmy Awards), won the PRIX ADAV for Best Educational film of the year at the Pariscience Festival International du Film Scientifque, won the Kavli-AAAS Science Journalism Gold Award for best in-depth science documentary of 2017, was included among Science Books & Film year-end list of Best Science Films OF 2017, and won numerous awards at various festivals, including the Audience Award Best in Fest-RiverRun International Film Festival 2016, the Best Feature Film-American Psychological Association Film Festival 2016, the Best Documentary – Indigo Moon film festival, the Best Documentary – High Falls Film Festival, NY, the Best Documentary, Audience Award, 2017 Durango Film Festival, and the Audience Favorite Award – Mill Valley Film Festival, CA.

Contributions to neuroscience, neuroanatomy, neuroplasticity
Neuroplasticity: Diamond was a pioneer in anatomical neuroscience whose major scientific contributions have changed forever how we view the human brain. Diamond produced the first scientific evidence of anatomical neuroplasticity in the early 1960s. At that time, the scientific consensus was that the nature of your brain was due to genetics and was unchangeable and fixed. Diamond showed that the structural components of the cerebral cortex can be altered by either enriched or impoverished environments at any age, from prenatal to extremely old age. Her initial anatomical experiment, and replication experiments, with young rats showed that the cerebral cortex of the enriched rats was 6% thicker than the cortex of the impoverished rats based on different kinds of early life experiences. An enriched cortex shows greater learning capacity while an impoverished one shows lesser learning capacity. These paradigm-changing results, published in 1964, helped to launch modern neuroscience.

Einstein's Brain:
In early 1984, Diamond received four blocks of the preserved brain of Albert Einstein from Thomas Stoltz Harvey. Harvey, pathologist of Princeton Hospital at the time of Einstein's death, had removed Einstein's brain during autopsy in 1955 and maintained personal possession of the brain. The fact that the Einstein brain tissue was already embedded in celloidin when the Diamond lab received it meant that their choice of methods of examination would be somewhat limited.  However, they were able to successfully analyze both the superior prefrontal (area 9) and inferior parietal (area 39) association cortices of the left and right hemispheres of Einstein's brain and compare results with the identical regions in the control base of 11 human, male, preserved brains. From previous analysis of the eleven control brains, the Diamond lab "learned the frontal cortex did have more glial cells/neuron than the parietal cortex." After many years of research, Diamond and her team had data proving that, in the rat brain, glial cells increased with enriched conditions, but did not increase with age. Diamond and her associates discovered that the big difference in all four areas was in nonneuronal cells. Einstein had more glial cells per neuron than the average male brains of the control group.  Importantly, the biggest difference was found in area 39 of the left hemisphere of Einstein's brain where the increase in the number of glial cells per neuron was statistically significantly greater than in the control brains. Astrocyte and oligodendrocyte glial cells were pooled for these results.

Diamond demonstrated that the structural arrangement of the male and female cortices is significantly different and can be altered in the absence of sex steroid hormones.

Diamond also showed that the dorsal lateral frontal cerebral cortex is bilaterally deficient in the immune deficient mouse and can be reversed with thymic transplants. In humans, cognitive stimulation increases circulating CD4-positive T lymphocytes, supporting the idea that immunity can be voluntarily modulated, in other words, that positive thinking can impact the immune system.

Selected publications 
Mohammed, A. H., Zhu, S. W., Darmopil, S., Hjerling-Leffler, J., Ernfors, P., Winblad, B., ... & Bogdanovic, N. (2002). Environmental enrichment and the brain. In Progress in brain research (Vol. 138, pp. 109–133). Elsevier.

Diamond, M. C. (2001). Response of the brain to enrichment. Anais da Academia Brasileira de Ciências, 73(2), 211–220.

Diamond, M. C. (1994). Hearts, Brains, and Education: A New Alliance for Science Curriculum. Higher Learning in America, 1980-2000, 273.

Diamond, M. C. (1990). An optimistic view of the aging brain. In Biomedical advances in aging (pp. 441–449). Springer, Boston, MA.

Diamond, M. C. (1988). Enriching heredity: The impact of the environment on the anatomy of the brain. Free Press.

Diamond, M. C., Scheibel, A. B., Murphy Jr, G. M., & Harvey, T. (1985). On the brain of a scientist: Albert Einstein. Experimental neurology, 88(1), 198–204.

Globus, A., Rosenzweig, M. R., Bennett, E. L., & Diamond, M. C. (1973). Effects of differential experience on dendritic spine counts in rat cerebral cortex. Journal of comparative and physiological psychology, 82(2), 175.

Diamond, M. C., Law, F., Rhodes, H., Lindner, B., Rosenzweig, M. R., Krech, D., & Bennett, E. L. (1966). Increases in cortical depth and glia numbers in rats subjected to enriched environment. Journal of Comparative Neurology, 128(1), 117–125.

Diamond, M. C., Krech, D., & Rosenzweig, M. R. (1964). The effects of an enriched environment on the histology of the rat cerebral cortex. Journal of Comparative Neurology, 123(1), 111–119.

Bennett, E. L., Diamond, M. C., Krech, D., & Rosenzweig, M. R. (1964). Chemical and anatomical plasticity of brain. Science, 146(3644), 610–619.

Diamond, M. C. (1963). Women in modern science. Journal of the American Medical Women's Association, 18, 891–896.

Rosenzweig, M. R., Krech, D., Bennett, E. L., & Diamond, M. C. (1962). Effects of environmental complexity and training on brain chemistry and anatomy: a replication and extension. Journal of comparative and physiological psychology, 55(4), 429.

Awards
Council for Advancement & Support of Education. Wash. D.C. award for California Professor of the Year and National Gold Medalist
California Biomedical Research Association Distinguished Service Award
Alumna of the Year—California Alumni Association
San Francisco Chronicle Hall of Fame
University Medal, La Universidad del Zulia, Maracaibo, Venezuela
Brazilian Gold Medal of Honor
Benjamin Ide Wheeler Service Award
The Distinguished Senior Woman Scholar in America awarded by the American Association of University Women, 1997.
Clark Kerr Award for Distinguished Leadership in Higher Education 2012
International House Alumni Faculty Award, 2016
Paola S. Timiras Memorial Award for Aging Research from the Center for Research and Education in Aging (CREA)2016
Distinguished Teaching Award 1975 awarded by the University of California Berkeley

References

1926 births
American women neuroscientists
Women anatomists
University of California, Berkeley alumni
University of Oslo alumni
University of California, Berkeley faculty
2017 deaths
Sportspeople from Los Angeles County, California
American neuroscientists
California Golden Bears women's tennis players
People from Glendale, California
People from La Crescenta-Montrose, California